The Hinckley Subdivision is a railway line that connects the Twin Cities to the Twin Ports in Minnesota and Wisconsin. This line was originally built by the Great Northern railroad. It branches north off the Staples Subdivision At Coon Creek junction in Coon Rapids, MN, and ends at Boylston junction where the tracks run to Duluth/Superior (The Twin Ports) via the Lakes subdivision.

BNSF is the operator of the Hinckley sub. Union Pacific & Canadian Pacific also run frequent traffic via trackage rights. The CN had trackage rights in the past until it bought out Wisconsin Central Railway, which now allows them to run traffic up to the twin ports via their own route, the Superior subdivision.

Trains 
The Hinckley sub mostly sees manifest, grain, coke & taconite trains. It occasionally sees potash and coal trains. 

As of January 2023, this line sees around 2-5 trains per day.

Locals 
The Hinckley Local runs on Mondays, Wednesdays and sometimes Fridays. It serves industries in Hinckley and Cambridge.

Sidings 
There are nine sidings on the Hinckley Subdivision. The Sidings are located in Andover, Cambridge, Grasston, Brook Park, Hinckley, Askov, Bruno, Nickerson, & Foxboro. The longest siding is in Andover with a length of 9,000 feet (1.75 miles)

Railfanning 
The Hinckley Subdivision is a TWC (track-warrant controlled) line, meaning there is no way to monitor traffic on the line with the help of ATCS monitor. A scanner with a decent antenna, or a heads up from fellow railfans is your best bet for railfanning here. 70% of traffic that runs on the Hinckley sub is usaually under the cover of darkness.

Steam excursions 
Steam Excursions have been hosted on this line in the past. The Milwaukee Road 261 hosted steam excursions for a few years up until the FRA mandated PTC on all locomotives that lead trains in the US. The Union Pacific Big Boy #4014 also hosted a steam excursion in 2019 that ran on the Hinckley Subdivision up to the Union Depot in Duluth, Minnesota.

Passenger service 
There is currently no operating passenger service on this line. The NLX is a proposed intercity passenger route between Minneapolis and Duluth, read more about that here.

External links
BNSF Subdivisions

BNSF Railway lines
Rail infrastructure in Minnesota
Rail infrastructure in Wisconsin
Great Northern Railway (U.S.)